Pachynoa circulalis is a moth in the family Crambidae. It was described by Sauber in 1899. It is found in the Philippines.

References

Moths described in 1899
Spilomelinae